Antoine Philippe is a combination of two French personal names. It is sometimes hyphenated.
 Antoine Philippe, Duke of Montpensier (1775-1807)
 Antoine Philippe de La Trémoïlle (1765-1794) French noble and royalist
 Antoine Philippe de Marigny de Mandeville (1722-1779) New Orléans explorer